Intisar Walid Ali Abu Amara (born May 20, 1958 in the Gaza Strip) is a Palestinian politician who held the position of Acting President of the Palestinian Presidency Office in 2015, and in 2018 she was appointed as its president.

Career
On July 7, 2005, Abu Emara was appointed Director General in the President's office. On January 1, 2008, she was promoted to the rank of Assistant Undersecretary, and on January 1, 2010 she became Under Secretary.
In 2015, she became Acting President of Presidential Debt, and on March 4, 2018, and also in 2019, she was formally appointed Chief of the Presidential Cabinet, with the rank of Minister. Its term was renewed in 2018 and also in 2019.

References

Fatah members
Living people
1958 births
People from the Gaza Strip